Radio Plymouth was a local radio station serving Plymouth, Devon in England.

The station was folded into Greatest Hits Radio South West, as part of a rebrand, on 1 November 2020.

History
Radio Plymouth was launched at 10am on Sunday 28 February 2010 by television presenter Phillip Schofield, an investor in the station. The first song played was The Way It Is by Bruce Hornsby and the Range. Tim Manns, formerly with Orchard FM Radio Plymouth's station manager and Drivetime presenter, welcomed listeners to a two-hour show which featured presenters.

Five companies applied in December 2005 for the licence to broadcast in Plymouth. It was won in March 2006 by a London company, Macquarie, under the name Diamond FM. The station failed to launch and the licence was given back to OFCOM. Two companies applied and Radio Plymouth won against UKRD's plan to extend its existing station, Pirate FM. The licence was one of the last to be granted by Ofcom during the final round of commercial licence awards.

Radio Plymouth was until 17 September 2020 owned 100 per cent by individuals through Radio Plymouth Limited. The licence covers Plymouth, which has a population aged 15 and older of 250,000.

Radio Plymouth currently has 18% reach in the city and is listened to by 35,000 listeners every week.

Most recently the station was launched on DAB in Plymouth and surrounding areas (Frequency 12D).

Closure
On 17 September 2020, Radio Plymouth announced its acquisition by Bauer with their intentions of using Radio Plymouth's business assets to expand the Greatest Hits Radio network.

Local programmes ended at 1100 hrs GMT on 1 November 2020. Radio Plymouth is now folded into the Greatest Hits Radio South West regional station.

References

External links
Radio Plymouth official site
Audio of launch
Radio Plymouth Media UK listing
Details of OFCOM's decision

Radio stations in Devon
Radio stations established in 2010
Mass media in Plymouth, Devon